The UK Singles Chart is one of many music charts compiled by the Official Charts Company that calculates the best-selling singles of the week in the United Kingdom. Before 2004, the chart was only based on the sales of physical singles. This list shows singles that peaked in the Top 10 of the UK Singles Chart during 1965, as well as singles which peaked in 1964 and 1966 but were in the top 10 in 1965. The entry date is when the single appeared in the top 10 for the first time (week ending, as published by the Official Charts Company, which is six days after the chart is announced).

One-hundred and eighteen singles were in the top ten in 1965. Eight singles from 1964 remained in the top 10 for several weeks at the beginning of the year, while "Let's Hang On!" by The Four Seasons featuring Frankie Valli, and "My Ship Is Comin' In" by The Walker Brothers were both released in 1965 but did not reach their peak until 1966. "I Could Easily Fall (In Love with You)" by Cliff Richard and The Shadows, and "Somewhere" by P. J. Proby were the singles from 1964 to reach their peak in 1965. Thirty-one artists scored multiple entries in the top 10 in 1965. Bob Dylan, The Seekers, Sonny & Cher, Tom Jones and The Who were among the many artists who achieved their first UK charting top 10 single in 1965.

The 1964 Christmas number-one, "I Feel Fine" by The Beatles, remained at number one for the first two weeks of 1965. The first new number-one single of the year was "Yeh, Yeh" by Georgie Fame and the Blue Flames. Overall, twenty-four different singles peaked at number-one in 1965, with The Rolling Stones and The Beatles (3) having the joint most singles hit that position.

Background

Multiple entries
One-hundred and eighteen singles charted in the top 10 in 1965, with one-hundred and ten singles reaching their peak this year. Two songs were recorded by several artists with each version reaching the top 10:

"All I Really Want to Do" - The Byrds, Cher
"You've Lost That Lovin' Feelin'" - Cilla Black, The Righteous Brothers

Thirty-one artists scored multiple entries in the top 10 in 1965. The Animals, The Beatles, Bob Dylan, Gene Pitney and Sandie Shaw shared the record for most top 10 hits in 1965 with four hit singles each.

Ken Dodd was one of a number of artists with two top-ten entries, including the number-one single "Ken Dodd" (with Geoff Love & His Orchestra). Cher, Dusty Springfield, Manfred Mann, The Shadows and Val Doonican were among the other artists who had multiple top 10 entries in 1965.

Chart debuts
Thirty-five artists achieved their first top 10 single in 1965, either as a lead or featured artist. Of these, seven went on to record another hit single that year: Cher, Donovan, The Fortunes, The Ivy League, Sonny, Them and The Walker Brothers. The Seekers, The Who and The Yardbirds all had two more top 10 singles in 1965. Bob Dylan had three other entries in his breakthrough year.

The following table (collapsed on desktop site) does not include acts who had previously charted as part of a group and secured their first top 10 solo single.

Notes
Cher and Sonny Bono made their debut as the duo Sonny and Cher, reaching number-one with "I Got You Babe". They both had an individual chart entry later in the year - "All I Really Want to Do" and "Laugh at Me" respectively both peaking at number 9.

Songs from films
Original songs from various films entered the top 10 throughout the year. These included "Ferry Cross the Mersey" (Ferry Cross the Mersey), "Help!" and "Ticket to Ride" (Help!) and "Zorba's Dance" (Zorba the Greek).

Additionally, P. J. Proby released a cover version of "Maria" from the film West Side Story, reaching number eight at the end of 1965.

Best-selling singles

Until 1970 there was no universally recognised year-end best-sellers list. However, in 2011 the Official Charts Company released a list of the best-selling single of each year in chart history from 1952 to date. According to the list, "Tears" by Ken Dodd is officially recorded as the biggest-selling single of 1965. "Tears" (3), "The Carnival Is Over" (6) and "Day Tripper"/"We Can Work It Out" (7) all ranked in the top 10 best-selling singles of the decade.

Top-ten singles
Key

Entries by artist

The following table shows artists who achieved two or more top 10 entries in 1965, including singles that reached their peak in 1964 or 1966. The figures include both main artists and featured artists. The total number of weeks an artist spent in the top ten in 1965 is also shown.

See also
1965 in British music
List of number-one singles from the 1960s (UK)

Notes

 "My Ship is Coming In" reached its peak of number three on 26 January 1966 (week ending).
 "Stop! In the Name of Love" re-entered the top 10 at number 10 on 5 May 1965 (week ending).
 "Where Are You Now (My Love)" was the theme song to the television series It's Dark Outside (a spin-off from The Odd Man). It was released as a single due to public demand and went to number-one.
 "Set Me Free" was used in the BBC television drama Up the Junction, created by Ken Loach in 1965. It was the first time a Kinks song had been featured in a television series or film.
 Figure includes single that peaked in 1964. 
 Figure includes single that first charted in 1964 but peaked in 1965.
 Figure includes a top 10 hit as the duo Sonny & Cher.
 Figure includes single that peaked in 1966.

References
General

Specific

External links
1965 singles chart archive at the Official Charts Company (click on relevant week)

Top 10 singles
United Kingdom
1965